Neuropathy target esterase, also known as patatin-like phospholipase domain-containing protein 6 (PNPLA6), is an esterase enzyme that in humans is encoded by the PNPLA6 gene.

Neuropathy target esterase is a phospholipase that deacetylates intracellular phosphatidylcholine to produce glycerophosphocholine. It is thought to function in neurite outgrowth and process elongation during neuronal differentiation. The protein is anchored to the cytoplasmic face of the endoplasmic reticulum in both neurons and non-neuronal cells.

Function 
Neuropathy target esterase is an enzyme with phospholipase B activity: it sequentially hydrolyses both fatty acids from the major membrane lipid phosphatidylcholine, generating water-soluble glycerophosphocholine. In eukaryotic cells, NTE is anchored to the cytoplasmic face of the endoplasmic reticulum membrane. In mammals, it is particularly abundant in neurons, the placenta, and the kidney. Loss of NTE activity results in abnormally-elevated levels of phosphatidylcholine in the brain and impairment of the constitutive secretory pathway in neurons.

In the kidney, the expression of neuropathy target esterase is regulated by TonEBP as part of osmolyte production when the kidney produces concentrated urine.

Clinical significance 
Mutations in this gene result in autosomal-recessive spastic paraplegia. The protein is also the target for neurodegeneration induced by organophosphorus compounds and chemical warfare agents.

Recessively-inherited mutations in NTE that substantially reduce its catalytic activity cause a rare form of hereditary spastic paraplegia (SPG39), in which distal parts of long spinal axons degenerate leading to limb weakness and paralysis. Organophosphate-induced delayed neuropathy a paralysing syndrome with distal degeneration of long axons results from poisoning with neuropathic organophosphorus compounds that irreversibly inhibit NTE.

References

Further reading

EC 3.1.1
Enzymes